Glogonj is a village in Serbia, situated in the South Banat District of the province of Vojvodina. It is located on the banks of the Tamiš River, about 20 kilometers northwest of Pančevo, and about 20 kilometers direct north of Belgrade. It has a Serb ethnic majority, numbering 3,012 people as of 2011. Its neighboring villages are Sefkerin to the north and Jabuka to the south. All of them lie on the Tamiš.

Name
The name 'Glogonj' refers to the shrubs of the Hawthorn tree, (Crataegus) that was prevalent in the settlement during ancient times.

The name was first mentioned as a settlement in 1586.

History

Early history
Throughout its history, Glogonj was colonized during several different periods. The first of these occurred during Austro-Hungarian rule with the arrival of German inhabitants. In 1718 the Habsburg monarchy had captured much of the Banat Region from the Ottomans and by the 1760s, they were fortifying the border regions of the Banat with German-speaking colonists from all over Central Europe, (Danube Swabians). The Danube River became the natural border between the Austrian Empire and Turkish-occupied Serbia. German-speaking Catholics began to settle in and around Glogon in the 1770s and 1780s to farm the land. A Catholic church (St. Anna) was first built during this era.
During the Autro-Turkish War (1788-1791) Glogon was burnt by Turkish forces and in 1790 it was raveged by cholera.

19th and early 20th Century
Romanian settlers arrived in the early 19th century. In 1806 an Orthodox Church was built. In 1812, a nursery of fruit trees was established in Glogon.

The population of Glogon for most of the 19th century was about a couple thousand people and most of the people spoke German. There was also a Romanian minority living there. After the formation of Austria-Hungary in 1867, Glogon and the neighboring villages fell under Hungarian jurisdiction. The Hungarian name of the village was 'Galagonyás'.

By the late 1890s and early 1900s, many young men and their families from Glogon, and the neighboring villages, left their homes to migrate to the United States and Canada to start a new life.

After the end of WWI, with the Treaty of Trianon in 1920, Glogon and the surrounding areas of the Banat become part of the newly established Kingdom of Serbs, Croats and Slovenes with Belgrade as its capital. German-speaking villages, such as Glogon, kept their autonomy 

In 1935, the village founded an amateur Football/Soccer Team, FK Glogonj.

Second World War
In April 1941, Nazi Germany Invaded Yugoslavia. The Panzer-Grenadier-Division 'Grossdeutschland' occupied Glogon and other surrounding villages as they captured Belgrade. Ethnic German men  in the Banat were recruited to join the German 'Wehrmacht' or the 'Waffen-SS'.

In October 1944, the Soviet Red Army and Yugoslav Partisans captured Glogon and the surrounding villages during the 'Belgrade Offensive'. Many of the ethnic Germans in Glogon were shot, the local Catholic priest was hung in the bell tower and some of the women were raped and found dead. The new communist Yugoslav regime began reprisals and deprived all ethnic Germans their citizenship and civil rights. On October 30, 1944, special detachments of the Yugoslav People's Liberation Committee shot 128 residents from Glogon on site. The surviving ethnic Germans were taken to labor camps in nearby areas, (such as Rudolfsgnad) where most would die of disease, starvation and the cold. The empty villages were fenced off, houses boarded up and remained abandoned for years.

Yugoslav Era
After the war, the village was repopulated with Serbs. Many Serbian citizens from undeveloped mountainous villages from the south of Serbia came to Glogonj, because of its fertile agricultural land and electrification. The inhabitants moved into the old "Swabian houses" and were given possession of several square meters of land. During the Yugoslav era, some memorable scenes in Yugoslav films were shot in the village, such as 'Aleksa Dundic' (1958) and 'The Mogols' (1961)

Post-Yugoslav Era
After the fall of communism in Eastern Europe in 1989, and the break-up of Yugoslavia in 1991, Glogonj was unaffected during the Yugoslav Wars. After the wars, ethnic German historians began to visit the Banat areas of their Danube-Swabian ancestors, such as in Glogonj. In the early 2000s a project was underway to renovate and repair the old German Roman Catholic cemetery outside of Glogonj. In June 2009, historian Anton Nahm, whose ancestors lived in Glogon, along with other political and church leaders, officially rededicated the cemetery and its new chapel.

In 2012 a new Orthodox Chruch (St. Pater and Paul) was built in Glogonj.

Historical Population
Austrian-Hungarian census of 1881 was only based on native language of 2468 total inhabitants, 11 spoke Hungarian, 1480 German, 8 Slovakian, 630 Romanian, 220 Croatian-Serbian, and 124 did not indicate any language priority according to own census statement: beszélni nem tudó. 
1910: 2,669 (1,745 Germans, 756 Romanians, 72 Hungarians, 61 Croats, 13 Serbs, 22 others
1961: 3,230
1971: 3,257
1981: 3,605
1991: 3,475
2002: 3,178 (2,400 Serbs, 927 Romanians, 367 Macedonians and 255 Others)

Notable Persons
Mathias Benrath and Nikola Živančević, exhibitors of agricultural products at World Exposition of 1873.
Lajos Szekrényi (1858—1915), Roman Catholic pastor, translator of works written by Karl May into Hungarian.
Goran Ilić (1887—1944), School caretaker at basics school of Jabuka, victim of Nazis family politics, buried in local cemetery.

Testimonies of German Terror on Village life

April 7, 1941 
Mannschaftsführer Michael Lang and his brother Jugendführer Bernhard had an idea of making a small contribution to Stojanović business store. Zoran Stojanović from Šabac bought the house of Büchler family, who emigrated to newly created Burgenland in 1923, because they could not see any future perspective in that state. Mister Stojanović had hung up his little blackboard from his school days behind the glass plane of store door, on which he always wrote in three languages with chalk: Closed or Back again soon. Smiling Lang brothers demanded that he must write on it Do not buy from Serbs since today and it could easily be wiped away again. On April 10, small shop window was covered with swastika flag and the slogan was written on the wall near entrance. On April 17, he took his wife Dragana and son to the southbound Kačarevo railway station, went to Weiss pharmacy in this village and came back home in the evening. Next morning he was found dead in his bed, an empty packet of sleeping pills on the bedside table. In wonderful shop with friendly service, each human being could buy and order everyday goods, newspapers and books. Planned escape as journey would have been risky for woman and child with male companion at this point in time. Lang gentlemen were actual authorities in the village, Ortsgruppenführer Gross lived in Sefkerin and was more pragmatic than those power politicians, despite his formally higher rank.

October 2, 1944
Nazi Ortsgruppenführer Johann Gross from Glogau, Sefkerin, Opovo, Baranda and Sakule was executed by Soviet soldiers in early afternoon at main entrance of Catholic church, sentenced to death by hanging. All German residents had to line up in front of the church, onlookers who did not want watching the execution were beaten by Soviets. In the evening a Soviet victory celebration began in  municipal office, in which all three daughters of the Ortsgruppenführer and the nurse Franziska Nedwetzky from Jabuka had to take part. Anne Gross was in total shock since her father's execution, stared with sad and tearless eyes into nothing and kept silent whole time. Soviet officer Valerij Putin tried very sensitively to get into a conversation with her at the celebration, but his numerous efforts were unsuccessful, in the course of the evening he was increasingly drunk and began to cry in front of Gross daughter, and shortly before midnight he felt asleep due to excessive alcohol consumption. Next morning he stepped out of municipal office into the fresh air at around two o'clock,
his face was white as chalk, he stood on shaky legs and vomited by main entrance, visibly marked from previous night.

October 3, 1944.
On the morning of that day, Franziska Nedwetzky and Anne Gross, both nurses from Red Cross, Rosalia and Theresia Gross, leaders from Glogon DMB, attempted collective suicide on the banks of Tamiš river. They had surrendered docilely and without violence to Soviet men at a victory celebration in municipal office last night, and fulfilled all their wishes according to their experiences. Nedwetzky inflicted herself deep cuts on both wrists, but  Gross siblings only scratched themselves on the body parts mentioned and bled less. A Soviet officer named Medvedev administered first aid to the three howling siblings and bandaged their wounds. Nedwetzky was bleeding profusely, was already standing in the water, suddenly went into hysterical screaming fits, but did not want any aid by OZNA reconnaissance officer Mirko Antonović who also rushed to help and tried to pull her out of the water because she was screaming: I don't want to die! Eventually, exhausted from the loss of blood, she collapsed in the river, and the already crying officer of Yugoslavian Partisans Army drew his pistol out of desperation and shot her in the right temple before he was also collapsing with loud screaming in the water. 
Nedwetzky was mistress of Unterleutnant Walter Steinmeier in Pantschowa since April 9, 1941. He is responsible for the massacre of urban civilians at cemetery wall of Catholic Cemetery ordered by Nazi leader Otto Vogenberger. Steinmeier was ambitious and soon a nickname was circulating among City population, which the Yugoslavian opportunist Fridrih Šaringer first uttered during a private purchase with his daughter in Ćurčin shop : vain monocle vulture, those expression referred to the Aryan nose shape of noble Unterleutnant and his optical vision aid.
On September 29, 1944, Nedwetzky was discovered by Medvedev in a basement of a house built near City fish market. She suffered total nervous breakdown in front of Soviet soldiers and screamed: I'm a damned miscarriage! I don't deserve to live on. Kill me right now! Her mother refused the entry to family home in Jabuka before they arrived her place of death with comment: You hang out with these Communist barbaric subhumans? My daughter has become a whore. I do not know you anymore.

In memory of Franc Lišic
On October 10, 1943, Sarajevo City was systematically combed through by units of SS Division Prinz Eugen and SS Division Handschar for urban civilian victims to intimidate the population due to the war situation developing to the disadvantage of the Germans. At Baščaršija Square, vain Rottenführer Johann Dietrich held an incendiary speech in front of his ten German men and the ten Bosnian men assigned to him. In his German troop were also battle-hardened and ruthlessly brutal Franc Rihart and his buddy Franc Nedr, and Josef Sklena. Dietrich spoke pathetically about the eternal disgrace of Sarajevo, that his men shall ruthlessly wiping out Serbian rat nests, and he wanted from them all bringing 1,000 bastards on this square being shot after successful operation. During first part of his speech, Rihart and Nedr started giggling and tried to hold back the laughter. Dietrich noticed that and yelled at both of them to shut up their stupid muzzles and only bring at least 50 people together without support. By evening victims of all ages had been rounded up and homicide began. Lišic refused during on his very first use to participate, recruited in April 1943 with rank SS-Schütze, but due to his weak physical constitution he was not deployed until those operation. He trembled when aiming the gun, Dietrich shouted several times in his left ear while standing very close, whereupon the gun fell to the ground and Lišic began to cry. This reaction caused Rihart to throw a tantrum and yelled at his officer to leave him alone, he is willing to do Lišic part of job, and Nedr tried to de-escalate the situation by talking to both of them. Warning, Dietrich ordered both of them to get back in line immediately and forced the weakling to take the gun again, he ordered him to be the first of all men to shoot, holding his pistol to his left temple. Lišic dropped the rifle again, whereupon Dietrich fired his weapon, then he ordered Rihart and Nedr that they must stand beside to all these subhuman dirt right now because of their destructive defense decomposition  behavior, and with exclamation: Now I am first of all men, and shot them both.

Internment myth
After takeover of power, soldiers from Narodooslobodilački odbor, which means People Liberation Committee of National Liberation Army, were billeted in German estates, registered agricultural production of household for confiscating most of it. It also happened that during this time personal relationships sometimes developed between the Partisans and German women, most of them were grass widows or even real widows. On April 15, 1946, very old weak people were transported by trucks to Kačarevo railway station with destination Knićanin for the first time. In most German and some English publications there are generally false statements about this time, which are probably attribute to network of escaped functionaries in FR Germany in coordination with Josef Janko and his Argentine network. In addition, it cannot be overlooked that style of presentation conceals a role as victims in the sense of Yugoslavian Jews.

See also
Pančevački Rit
List of places in Serbia
List of cities, towns and villages in Vojvodina

References

External links
 
 Glogonj on the Official Website by the municipality of Pančevo (Serbian)

Populated places in Serbian Banat
Populated places in South Banat District
Pančevo